George Michael Moloney (7 August 1909 – 5 January 1983) was an Australian rules footballer who played for the Claremont Football Club in the West Australian National Football League (WANFL) and for the Geelong Football Club in the Victorian Football League (VFL).

An inaugural member of the Australian Football Hall of Fame and an inaugural Legend of the West Australian Football Hall of Fame, "Specka" Moloney had a formidable reputation as a centre, a goalsneak and a key forward. He is one of few players to kick 100 or more goals in a season in both the WANFL and the VFL/AFL competitions. 

After four years at Claremont in the 1920s, Moloney drew strong attention as a goalsneak for Western Australia at the 1930 Adelaide Carnival. The following year, he moved to Victoria and joined the Geelong Football Club, where he played for five years, generally at full forward; he won a premiership with the club in 1931, and kicked 109 goals in 1932.

In 1936, Moloney returned to Claremont in the WANFL, he won the Sandover Medal in 1936 as the league's fairest and best player playing primarily as a centre. In 1938, he led Claremont to its first-ever premiership, and repeated the feat in the next two seasons.

All told, he played a total of 190 WA(N)FL games, some of them alongside brothers Robert (103 games 1930-36) and Syd (145 games 1934-41).

Arguably the greatest name in the history of the Claremont Football Club, and certainly one of the most uniquely versatile champions ever to have adorned the game, George "Specka" Moloney rounded off his association with the Tigers by coaching them, without much success, from 1948 to 1951.

In 1996, Moloney was inducted into the Australian Football Hall of Fame and in 2004 he was inducted into the West Australian Football Hall of Fame where he has legend status.

References

Bibliography

External links
 
 
 Profile at WAFL FootyFacts website
 AFL Hall of Fame - Players
 Profile at WAFL Hall of Fame website

1909 births
1983 deaths
Geelong Football Club players
Geelong Football Club Premiership players
Claremont Football Club players
Claremont Football Club coaches
Australian Football Hall of Fame inductees
Carji Greeves Medal winners
Sandover Medal winners
VFL Leading Goalkicker Medal winners
West Australian Football Hall of Fame inductees
One-time VFL/AFL Premiership players
Australian rules footballers from Fremantle